Casa Branca is a civil parish in the municipality of Sousel.

Location and statistics

References 

Parishes of Sousel